Reynir Böðvarsson is an Icelandic seismologist working at Uppsala University in Sweden. He is responsible for the Swedish National Seismology Network.

External 
Seismology Institute Uppsala University
Swedish National Seismology Net Homepage

Living people
Year of birth missing (living people)
Academic staff of Uppsala University
Seismologists
Reynir Bodvarsson
Reynir Bodvarsson
Reynir Bodvarsson